The Convention on International Liability for Damage Caused by Space Objects, also known as the Space Liability Convention, is a treaty from 1972 that expands on the liability rules created in the Outer Space Treaty of 1967. In 1978, the crash of the nuclear-powered Soviet satellite Kosmos 954 in Canadian territory led to the only claim filed under the convention.

Status
The Liability Convention was concluded and opened for signature on 29 March 1972. It entered into force on 1 September 1972. As of 1 January 2021, 98 States have ratified the Liability Convention, 19 have signed but not ratified and four international intergovernmental organizations (the European Space Agency, the European Organisation for the Exploitation of Meteorological Satellites, the Intersputnik International Organization of Space Communications, and the European Telecommunications Satellite Organization) have declared their acceptance of the rights and obligations provided for in the Agreement.

Key provisions
States (countries) bear international responsibility for all space objects that are launched within their territory. This means that regardless of who launches the space object, if it was launched from State A's territory, or from State A's facility, or if State A caused the launch to happen, then State A is fully liable for damages that result from that space object.

Joint launches
If two states work together to launch a space object, then both of those states are jointly and severally liable for the damage that object causes. This means that the injured party can sue either of the two states for the full amount of damage.

Claims between states only
Claims under the Liability Convention must be brought by the state against a state. The convention was created to supplement existing and future national laws providing compensation to parties injured by space activities. Whereas under most national legal systems an individual or a corporation may bring a lawsuit against another individual or another corporation, under the Liability Convention claims must be brought on the state level only. This means that if an individual is injured by a space object and wishes to seek compensation under the Liability Convention, the individual must arrange for his or her country to make a claim against the country that launched the space object that caused the damage.

See also
 USA-193
 Kosmos 954
 Skylab
 Space law
 Outer Space Treaty
 Moon Treaty
 Rescue Agreement
 Space debris

References

External links
United Nations Office for Outer Space Affairs: Convention on International Liability for Damage Caused by Space Objects

Liability treaties
Space treaties
Space law
Treaties concluded in 1972
Treaties entered into force in 1972
Treaties of Algeria
Treaties of Antigua and Barbuda
Treaties of Argentina
Treaties of Australia
Treaties of Austria
Treaties of the Byelorussian Soviet Socialist Republic
Treaties of Belgium
Treaties of Bosnia and Herzegovina
Treaties of Botswana
Treaties of the military dictatorship in Brazil
Treaties of the People's Republic of Bulgaria
Treaties of Canada
Treaties of Chile
Treaties of the People's Republic of China
Treaties of Cuba
Treaties of Cyprus
Treaties of the Czech Republic
Treaties of Czechoslovakia
Treaties of Denmark
Treaties of Ecuador
Treaties of Fiji
Treaties of Finland
Treaties of France
Treaties of Gabon
Treaties of West Germany
Treaties of East Germany
Treaties of the Kingdom of Greece
Treaties of the Hungarian People's Republic
Treaties of India
Treaties of Indonesia
Treaties of Pahlavi Iran
Treaties of Ba'athist Iraq
Treaties of Ireland
Treaties of Israel
Treaties of Italy
Treaties of Japan
Treaties of Kazakhstan
Treaties of Kuwait
Treaties of the Kingdom of Laos
Treaties of Lebanon
Treaties of the Libyan Arab Jamahiriya
Treaties of Mexico
Treaties of the Mongolian People's Republic
Treaties of Montenegro
Treaties of Morocco
Treaties of the Netherlands
Treaties of New Zealand
Treaties of Niger
Treaties of Nigeria
Treaties of Norway
Treaties of Pakistan
Treaties of Papua New Guinea
Treaties of Peru
Treaties of the Polish People's Republic
Treaties of Qatar
Treaties of South Korea
Treaties of the Socialist Republic of Romania
Treaties of the Soviet Union
Treaties of Saint Vincent and the Grenadines
Treaties of Serbia and Montenegro
Treaties of Seychelles
Treaties of Singapore
Treaties of Slovakia
Treaties of Slovenia
Treaties of South Africa
Treaties of Francoist Spain
Treaties of Sri Lanka
Treaties of Sweden
Treaties of Switzerland
Treaties of Syria
Treaties of Tunisia
Treaties of Turkey
Treaties of the Ukrainian Soviet Socialist Republic
Treaties of the United Kingdom
Treaties of the United States
Treaties of Uruguay
Treaties of Yugoslavia
Treaties of Zambia
Treaties of Benin
Treaties of the Dominican Republic
Treaties of Liechtenstein
Treaties of Luxembourg
Treaties of Mali
Treaties of Malta
Treaties of Panama
Treaties of Saudi Arabia
Treaties of Senegal
Treaties of Togo
Treaties of Trinidad and Tobago
Treaties of the United Arab Emirates
Treaties of Venezuela
Treaties of Kenya
Treaties extended to Greenland
Treaties extended to the Faroe Islands
Treaties extended to Aruba
Treaties extended to the Netherlands Antilles
Treaties extended to Saint Christopher-Nevis-Anguilla
Treaties extended to British Antigua and Barbuda
Treaties extended to Bermuda
Treaties extended to the British Virgin Islands
Treaties extended to Brunei (protectorate)
Treaties extended to the Cayman Islands
Treaties extended to British Dominica
Treaties extended to the Falkland Islands
Treaties extended to Gibraltar
Treaties extended to British Grenada
Treaties extended to British Hong Kong
Treaties extended to Montserrat
Treaties extended to the Pitcairn Islands
Treaties extended to Saint Helena, Ascension and Tristan da Cunha
Treaties extended to British Saint Lucia
Treaties extended to British Saint Vincent and the Grenadines
Treaties extended to the British Solomon Islands
Treaties extended to South Georgia and the South Sandwich Islands
Treaties extended to the Turks and Caicos Islands